Federico Vanelli (born 9 March 1991) is an Italian marathon swimmer. He placed seventh in the men's marathon 10 kilometre event at the 2016 Summer Olympics.

References

External links
 

1991 births
Living people
Olympic swimmers of Italy
Swimmers at the 2016 Summer Olympics
World Aquatics Championships medalists in open water swimming
Italian male long-distance swimmers
Swimmers of Fiamme Oro
European Open Water Swimming Championships medalists
21st-century Italian people